Yogendra Pathak Viyogi (Y. P. Viyogi) is an Indian physicist at Indian National Science Academy. He is specialized in the field of experimental nuclear physics.

Early life 
He born at Madhubani in the year 1948. He completed his primary education at his own village.

Education 
He received his post graduate degree in physics from Bihar University in Muzaffarpur.

Scientific career 
He joined the 15th batch of Training School Programme of Bhabha Atomic Research Centre, Mumbai in 1971. He was trained in experimental nuclear physics at BARC and at Lawrence Berkeley laboratory, USA. He moved to Kolkata to work at the Variable Energy Cyclotron Centre, a unit of the Department of Atomic Energy and obtained his PhD in 1984 from the University of Calcutta. He was also a postdoctoral fellow at GANIL Laboratory in France from 1984 to 1986. He was Director of Institute of Physics, Bhubaneswar during June 2006 – June 2009. He retired from service in October 2012 as Outstanding Scientist at VECC Kolkata.

References 

Indian physicists
Nuclear physics
Mithila
People from Madhubani district
1948 births
Maithil Brahmin
Living people